Associazione Sportiva Deruta is an Italian association football club located in Deruta, Umbria. It currently plays in Serie D.

History
The club was founded in 1926.

Colors and badge 
Its colors are white and blue.

References

External links
Official homepage

Football clubs in Italy
Football clubs in Umbria
Association football clubs established in 1926
1926 establishments in Italy